Channappetta  is a village in Kollam district in the state of Kerala, India.

Demographics
 India census, Channappetta had a population of 8,211 with 3,914 males and 4,297 females.

References

Villages in Kollam district